Shegaon railway station is railway station located on Nagpur–Bhusawal section of Howrah–Nagpur–Mumbai line of Indian Railways. It is located near Panchayat Samiti Office, on North West side of Shegaon town, which is famous for Shri Sant Gajanan Maharaj.

The railway station comes under the Bhusawal railway division of Central Railway zone. Its IR Station code is SEG. As of 2019 around 46 trains halt at this station. It serves Shegaon taluka and neighboring talukas of Buldhana district of Maharashtra.

References

Railway stations in Buldhana district
Bhusawal railway division